Nikolaos "Nikos" Diplaros (born June 28, 1997) is a Greek professional basketball player who last played for Apollon Patras of the Greek Basket League. He is a 1.90 m (6 ft 2 in) tall combo guard.

Professional career
Diplaros spent the 2014–15 season with the Greek club Esperos Patras, playing in the amateur level 4th tier division of Greek basketball, the Greek C League. In 2015, he signed a 5-year contract with the Greek 1st Division club AEK. However, he was then released by AEK, before he played any games with them, after he told the press that he wanted to play for an even bigger club than AEK Athens in the future.

A few days after, Aris Thessaloniki approached the player and signed him to a 3-year contract. He then began his professional career with Aris in 2015. In September 2016, Aris loaned him to the Greek 2nd Division club Machites Doxas Pefkon.

He joined the Greek club Panionios in 2017. On September 3, 2018, Diplaros renewed his contract for another season. He subsequently spent the next season and a half between Montenegro (Lovćen) and Georgia (Batumi).

On September 10, 2020, Diplaros signed a two-year (1+1) contract with Panathinaikos as an auxiliary player. In 13 games in the Greek Basket League, he averaged 3 points, 0.5 rebounds and 0.6 assists, playing around 8 minutes per contest. He also appeared in 3 EuroLeague matches with the Greens. Diplaros won both the Greek League and the Greek Cup titles during his short tenure. On July 26, 2021, his contract option was not picked up and he parted ways with the historic club.

Diplaros spent the 2021-22 campaign with Apollon Patras and in 24 league games, he averaged 8.5 points, 2.6 rebounds, 4.7 assists and 1 steal, playing around 27 minutes per contest.

National team career
Diplaros was a member of the Greek junior national teams. With the junior national teams of Greece, Diplaros played at the 2014 FIBA Under-17 World Cup, the 2015 FIBA Europe Under-18 Championship, where he won a gold medal, and at the 2nd division 2016 FIBA Europe Under-20 Championship Division B, where he won a bronze medal.

He also played at the 2017 FIBA Europe Under-20 Championship, where he won a gold medal.

References

External links
EuroCup Profile
FIBA Profile
FIBA Europe Profile
Eurobasket.com Profile
Greek Basket League Profile 
Hellenic Federation Profile 
Instagram Account

1997 births
Living people
Aris B.C. players
Apollon Patras B.C. players
Basketball players from Patras
BC Balkan Botevgrad players
Greek men's basketball players
Greek Basket League players
KK Lovćen players
Machites Doxas Pefkon B.C. players
Panathinaikos B.C. players
Panionios B.C. players
Point guards
Shooting guards